The Benjamin Helm House is a two-story brick house in Elizabethtown, Kentucky, that was built in 1816 and added to the National Register of Historic Places in 1988. It is significant as the home of Benjamin Helm, an early settler of Elizabethtown.  He made the first survey of the town and later became a wealthy local businessman, dying in 1858. He was the uncle of Governor John L. Helm, and great uncle of Confederate general Benjamin Hardin Helm.

The house was originally built in the Federal style.  Two wings were removed and several additions added such that the house itself is no longer architecturally significant.

See also

 Helm Place (Elizabethtown, Kentucky)
 Larue-Layman House
 LaRue family
 National Register of Historic Places listings in Hardin County, Kentucky

References

Houses on the National Register of Historic Places in Kentucky
Houses completed in 1816
Houses in Hardin County, Kentucky
LaRue family
1816 establishments in Kentucky
National Register of Historic Places in Hardin County, Kentucky
Elizabethtown, Kentucky